Tu Amor may refer to:

 "Tu Amor" (Jon B. song), 1997, later covered by RBD in 2006
 "Tu Amor" (Luis Fonsi song), 2006
 "Tu Amor", 1998 song by Olga Tañón from the album Te Acordarás de Mí